The  is an expressway on Okinawa Island in Okinawa Prefecture, Japan. The West Nippon Expressway Company is the owner and operator of this expressway. It is signed E58 under the "2016 Proposal for Realization of Expressway Numbering".

Route description

Tolls
The toll from end to end is 1020 yen for normal-sized cars and 840 yen for kei cars. For comparison, the Tomei and Tōhoku Expressways radiating from Tokyo have tolls of about 1650 yen for similar distances.

Utilization

In 2002, an average of 23,910 vehicles per day used the expressway. This was a 5.6% increase from the previous year. This is the only expressway in Japan having more than 20% kei car traffic; the national average is 7.3%.

Junction list
The entire expressway is in Okinawa Prefecture.

References

Expressways in Japan
Roads in Okinawa Prefecture
1975 establishments in Japan